The Colworth Medal is awarded annually by the Biochemical Society to an outstanding research biochemist under the age of 35 and working mainly in the United Kingdom. The award is one of the most prestigious recognitions for young scientists in the UK, and was established by Tony James FRS at Unilever Research and Henry Arnstein  of the Biochemical Society and takes its name from a Unilever research laboratory near Bedford in the UK, Colworth House.

The medal was first presented in 1963 and many of those receiving the award are recognised as outstanding scientists achieving international reputations. The lecture is published in Biochemical Society Transactions, previously Colworth Medal lectures were published in The Biochemical Journal.

Laureates
Source:

 2021: Giulia Zanetti
 2020: Stephan Uphoff
 2019: Melina Schuh 
 2018: Matthew Johnson 
 2017: Markus Ralser 
 2016: David Grainger
 2015: Helen Walden
 2014: M. Madan Babu
 2013: 
 2012: Akhilesh Reddy
 2011: Sarah Teichmann
 2010: 
 2009: 
 2008: 
 2007: Frank Sargent
 2006: Simon J. Boulton
 2005: 
 2004: James H. Naismith
 2003: 
 2002: 
 2001: 
 2000: Dario Alessi
 1999: Nigel Scrutton
 1998: David Barford
 1997: Stephen P. Jackson
 1996: Sheena Radford
 1995: Jonathon Pines
 1994: 
 1993: Nicholas Tonks
 1992: 
 1991: Michael A. J. Ferguson
 1990: 
 1988: Hugh Pelham
 1987: C. Peter Downes
 1986: Greg Winter
 1985: Alec Jeffreys
 1984: 
 1983: 
 1982: 
 1981: Terence H. Rabbitts
 1980: Richard A. Flavell
 1979: Ronald Laskey
 1978: 
 1977: Philip Cohen
 1976: George Brownlee
 1975: 
 1974: 
 1973: 
 1972: John M. Ashworth
 1971: 
 1970: Dai Rees
 1969: George Radda
 1968: 
 1967: 
 1966: Mark Henry Richmond
 1965: 
 1964: Jamshed R. Tata
 1963: Hans Kornberg

See also

 List of biochemistry awards

References 

Biochemistry awards
Biology in the United Kingdom
British science and technology awards
Awards established in 1963